Facetotecta is a poorly known subclass of thecostracan crustaceans. The adult forms have never been recognised, and the group is known only from its larvae, the "y-nauplius" and "y-cyprid" larvae. They are mostly found in the north Atlantic Ocean, neritic waters around Japan, and the Mediterranean Basin, where they also survive in brackish water.

History
The German zoologist Christian Andreas Victor Hensen first collected facetotectans from the North Sea in 1887, but assigned them to the copepod family Corycaeidae; later Hans Jacob Hansen named them "y-nauplia", assuming them to be the larvae of unidentified barnacles. More recently, it has been suggested that, since there is a potential gap in the tantulocarid life cycle, y-larvae may be the larvae of tantulocarids. However, this would be "a very tight fit", and it is more likely that the adult forms have not yet been seen. Genetic analysis using 18S ribosomal DNA reveal Facetotecta to be the sister group to the remaining Thecostraca (Ascothoracida and Cirripedia).

Life cycle

Nauplius
The abdomen is relatively long, and also ornamented. In common with other thecostracans, Facetotecta pass through five naupliar instars before undergoing a single cyprid phase.

Cyprid
The presence of a distinctive cyprid larva indicates that the Facetotecta is a member of the Thecostraca. A number of species have been described on the basis of a y-cyprid alone. As in barnacles, the cyprid is adapted to seeking a place to settle as an adult. It has compound eyes, can walk using its antennae, and is capable of producing an adhesive glue.

Juvenile
In 2008, a juvenile form was artificially produced by treating y-larvae with the hormone 20-hydroxyecdysone, which stimulated ecdysis and the transition to a new life phase. The resulting animal, named the ypsigon, was slug-like, apparently unsegmented, and limbless.

Adults
While they have never been seen, the adult facetotectans may be endoparasites of other animals, some of which could be inhabitants of coral reefs.

Species
Eleven species are currently recognised, while one species which is assigned to Hansenocaris – H. hanseni (Steuer, 1905) – is of uncertain affinities:

Hansenocaris acutifrons Itô, 1985
Hansenocaris corvinae Belmonte, 2005
Hansenocaris furcifera Itô, 1989
Hansenocaris itoi Kolbasov & Høeg, 2003
Hansenocaris leucadea Belmonte, 2005
Hansenocaris mediterranea Belmonte, 2005
Hansenocaris pacifica Itô, 1985
Hansenocaris papillata Kolbasov & Grygier, 2007
Hansenocaris rostrata Itô, 1985
Hansenocaris salentina Belmonte, 2005
Hansenocaris tentaculata Itô, 1986

References 

Maxillopoda
Parasitic crustaceans